The following is a list of notable events related to Philippine music in 2018.

Events

May
Sony Music Philippines resumed its operations after 6 years following the expiration of its distribution contract with Ivory Music, with their new office still in Ortigas Center, Pasig.

June
 June 2 – Janine Berdin from Lapu-Lapu, Cebu was hailed as the Grand Champion of the second year of Tawag ng Tanghalan on It's Showtime.

September
 Coke Studio Philippines announced its lineup of contemporary and indie Filipino acts for its 2nd season, namely: IV of Spades, Shanti Dope, December Avenue, Ben&Ben, KZ Tandingan, Moira Dela Torre, Sam Concepcion, Quest, Juan Miguel Severo, AJ Rafael, Khalil Ramos, Kriesha Chu, and DJ Patty Tiu.
 September 30 – Golden Cañedo of Cebu City was proclaimed as the champion of the first season of The Clash.

November
 November 11 — "Tugtog", composed by John Paul Salazar and interpreted by Bradz, was hailed as the winning entry in the 2018 A Song of Praise Music Festival Grand Finals Night held at the New Frontier Theater

Debuts/Disbanded

Soloist
John Roa
Janine Berdin
Zion Aquino
Migz Haleco
Karencitta
Shanti Dope
Mhot
TALA
RVRD
Fern.
Coeli
Angelo Acosta
Because
Juan Miguel Severo
Memphiis
AC Bonifacio
Janine Teñoso
Unique
Kyline Alcantara
Isabella Vinzon
Jeremy Glinoga
Kyle Juliano
Mark Oblea

Duoist/Bands/Groups
Better Days
Stellar
Where's Ramona?
Mandaue Nights
One Click Straight
Farewell Fair Weather
Bawal Clan
Music Hero Band
MNL48
Kakaiboys
This Band
AM/FM
Over October
Malana
The Metro Fantastic
July XIV
SB19

Disbanded
 Jensen and The Flips

Reunion/Comeback
 Urbandub

On Hiatus
 Run Dorothy

Albums released
The following albums are to be released in 2018 locally. Note: All soundtracks are not included in this list.

Concerts and music festivals

Local artists

International artists

Music festivals

Canceled/postponed dates

Awarding ceremonies
 January 15 – 3rd Wish 107.5 Music Awards, organized by Wish 1075
 May 15 – Myx Music Awards 2018, organized by myx
 July 21 - MOR Pinoy Music Awards 2018, organized by MOR 101.9
 August 19 – 10th PMPC Star Awards for Music, organized by Philippine Movie Press Club
 October 15 – 31st Awit Awards, organized by the Philippine Association of the Record Industry

Deaths
 March 27 – Bert Nievera (b. 1936), singer
 September 2 – Rene Garcia, (b. 1952), former member of Hotdog
 October 30 – Rico J. Puno (b. 1953), Filipino singer, comedian, actor and television host

Notes

References

Philippines
Music
Philippine music industry